Michel Meslin (29 September 1926, Paris – 12 April 2010, Paris) was a professor at and president of the Université de Paris-Sorbonne (Paris IV). He established the Institut de Recherche pour l'Etude des Religions (IRER). A specialist in late antiquity, the history of Christianity and anthropology of religion, he published several works on these and other subjects.

Bibliography 
 Les Ariens d'Occident (1967)
 Le Christianisme dans l'empire romain (1970)
 Pour une science des Religions, Le Seuil, (1973)
 L'Homme Romain (1978)
 Histoire de l'Eglise par elle-même Fayard, 1978, avec Jacques Loew.
 L'Expérience humaine du divin Paris, Le Cerf, 1988.
 Les Religions, la médecine, et l'origine de la vie Odile Jacob, 2001, avec Ysé Tardan-Masquelier et Alain Proust.
 Quand les Hommes parlent aux dieux, histoire de la prière dans les civilisations Bayard, 2003
 La Quête de guérison, Médecine et religions face à la souffrance Bayard, 2006 avec Ysé Tardan-Masquelier.
 Des mythes fondateurs pour notre humanité Complexe, 2007
 L'Homme et le religieux Honoré Champion, 2010

References

1926 births
2010 deaths
Academic staff of the University of Paris
French male writers